Suto may refer to:

People
 Agnes Suto (born 1992), Icelandic gymnast
 András Sütő (1927–2006), Romanian politician
 Enikő Sütő (born 1958), Hungarian celebrity
 József Sütő (born 1937), Hungarian long-distance runner
 László Sütő (born 1986), Hungarian football player
 Marijan Šuto (born 1996), Croatian football player
 Masatoshi Suto (born 1945), Japanese skier
 Naoki Suto (born 2002), Japanese football player
 Petar Šuto (born 1980), Croatian football player
 Sumire Suto (born 1997), Japanese pair skater
 Suto Mamoian (born 1981), Ukrainian politician

Other
 Miu Suto, Engine Sentai Go-onger character